The Reno Nevada Temple is the 81st operating temple of the Church of Jesus Christ of Latter-day Saints (LDS Church).

History
The first temple in Nevada was built in Las Vegas in 1989. The Reno Nevada temple was dedicated in 2000. It serves over 25,000 Latter-day Saints in the area.

A groundbreaking ceremony was held on July 24, 1999. Before it was dedicated, the temple was opened to the public. Thomas S. Monson, First Counselor in the church's First Presidency, dedicated the Reno Nevada Temple on April 23, 2000.

In 2020, the Reno Nevada Temple was closed in response to the coronavirus pandemic.

See also

 Comparison of temples of The Church of Jesus Christ of Latter-day Saints
 List of temples of The Church of Jesus Christ of Latter-day Saints
 List of temples of The Church of Jesus Christ of Latter-day Saints by geographic region
 Temple architecture (Latter-day Saints)
 The Church of Jesus Christ of Latter-day Saints in Nevada

Additional reading

References

External links
 
Reno Nevada Temple Official site
Reno Nevada Temple at ChurchofJesusChristTemples.org

20th-century Latter Day Saint temples
Buildings and structures in Reno, Nevada
The Church of Jesus Christ of Latter-day Saints in Nevada
Religious buildings and structures in Nevada
Temples (LDS Church) completed in 2000
Temples (LDS Church) in Nevada
2000 establishments in Nevada